{{Taxobox
| color = lightgrey
| name = Geobacillus
| domain = Bacteria
| phylum = Bacillota
| classis = Bacilli
| ordo = Bacillales
| familia = Bacillaceae
| genus = Geobacillus
| genus_authority =  Nazina et al. 2001
|image= Geobacillus stearothermophilus NRRL B-1172 (Type Strain).jpg
|image_caption= Geobacillus stearothermophilus'’ on agar plate
| type_species = Geobacillus stearothermophilus| subdivision_ranks = Species
| subdivision = G. caldoxylosilyticus G. galactosidasius  G. icigianusG. jurassicus   G. kaustophilus  G. lituanicus  G. stearothermophilus   G. subterraneus  G. thermantarcticus   G. thermocatenulatus  G. thermodenitrificans G. thermoglucosidasius  G. thermoleovorans  G. toebii   G.uzenensis  G. vulcani 
}}Geobacillus'' is a bacterial genus from the family of Bacillaceae.

References

Further reading 
 
 
 
 
 

Bacillaceae
Bacteria genera